CITU may stand for:

 Cebu Institute of Technology – University, educational institution in the Philippines
 Centre for Islamic Thought and Understanding (CITU), academic centre for Universiti Teknologi MARA, Malaysia
 The Centre of Indian Trade Unions
 CITU (Création Interactive Transdisciplinaire Universitaire) Lab, university laboratory for arts and new media of University of Paris VIII, France